
NVC community CG7 (Festuca ovina - Hieracium pilosella - Thymus praecox/pulegioides grassland) is one of the calcicolous grassland communities in the British National Vegetation Classification system. It is one of three short-sward communities associated with heavy grazing, within the lowland calcicolous grassland group, and is regarded as the eastern counterpart of "typical" chalk grassland (community CG2).

It is a comparatively widely distributed community. There are five subcommunities.

Community composition

The following constant species are found in this community:
 Sheep's Fescue (Festuca ovina)
 Mouse-ear Hawkweed (Hieracium pilosella)
 Rough Hawkbit (Leontodon hispidus)
 Wild Thyme (Thymus praecox) / Large Thyme (T. pulegioides)
 Cypress-leaved Plait-moss (Hypnum cupressiforme) 

The following rare species are also associated with the community:
 Field Wormwood (Artemisia campestris)
 Purple Milk-vetch (Astragalus danicus)
 Rare Spring-sedge (Carex ericetorum)
 Wall Bedstraw (Galium parisiense)
 Lizard Orchid (Himantoglossum hircinum)
 Hutchinsia (Hornungia petraea)
 Bur Medick (Medicago minima)
 Sickle Medick (Medicago falcata)
 Sand Lucerne (Medicago sativa ssp. varia)
 Fine-leaved Sandwort (Minuartia hybrida)
 Purple-stem Cat's-tail (Phleum phleoides)
 Spring Cinquefoil (Potentilla neumanniana)
 Sand Catchfly (Silene conica)
 Spanish Catchfly (Silene otites)
 Breckland Thyme (Thymus serpyllum)
 Spiked Speedwell (Veronica spicata)
 Spring Speedwell (Veronica verna)
 Side-fruited Crisp-moss Pleurochaeta squarrosa
 the lichen Bacidia muscorum
 the lichen Buellia epigaea
 the lichen Diploschistes scrupsos var. bryophilus
 the lichen Fulgensia fulgens
 the lichen Lecidea decipiens
 the lichen Squamaria lentigera
 the lichen Toximia caerulea var. nigricans
 the lichen Toximia lobulata

Distribution

This community is found scattered throughout chalk grassland sites in southern England, particularly in The Brecks on the Norfolk/Suffolk border, with outlying clusters in the Yorkshire Wolds (also on chalk), and on Carboniferous limestone in Derbyshire and Mendip Hills.

Subcommunities

There are five subcommunities:
 the Koeleria macrantha subcommunity
 the Cladonia spp. subcommunity
 the Ditrichum flexicaule - Diploschistes scruposus var. bryophilus subcommunity
 the Fragaria vesca - Erigeron acer subcommunity
 the Medicago lupulina - Rumex acetosa subcommunity

References

 Rodwell, J. S. (1992) British Plant Communities Volume 3 - Grasslands and montane communities  (hardback),  (paperback)

CG07